Gornji Korićani is a village in the municipalities of Travnik and Kneževo, Bosnia and Herzegovina.

The village is located on a hill (about 1270 m) between Pljačkovac (south-west) and  Crna rijeka (Black River), a tributary of Ilomska (northeast).

Population

See also
Korićani Cliffs massacre

References

External links 
 Zvanična stranica općine Travnik

Populated places in Travnik
Villages in Bosnia and Herzegovina